Orange Valley was launched at Bristol in 1781 as a West Indiaman. A French squadron captured and burnt her on 21 July 1796.

Career
Orange Valley entered Lloyd's Register (LR) in 1781. Between 1781 and 1783, LR conflated her with the Bristol-built .

Fate
A French squadron captured Orange Valley, Wade, master, in the Atlantic Ocean and burnt her. She was on a voyage from Jamaica to Bristol.

Citations

1781 ships
Ships built in Bristol
Age of Sail merchant ships of England
Captured ships
Maritime incidents in 1796